NetEase, Inc. is a Chinese Internet technology company providing online services centered on content, community, communications, and commerce. The company was founded in 1997 by Ding Lei. NetEase develops and operates online PC and mobile games, advertising services, email services, and e-commerce platforms in China. It is one of the largest Internet and video game companies in the world. NetEase has an on-demand music-streaming service (NetEase Music). The company also owns several pig farms.

NetEase video games include, the Westward Journey series, Tianxia III, Heroes of Tang Dynasty Zero, Ghost II, Nostos and Onmyoji. NetEase also partnered with Blizzard to operate Chinese versions of their games, such as World of Warcraft, StarCraft II, and Overwatch from 2008 to 2023.

History
The company was founded in June 1997 by Chinese entrepreneur Ding Lei, and grew rapidly due in part to its investment in search engine technology. In 2012 the company's official English name was changed from NetEase.com, Inc to NetEase, Inc.

Early in the company's history, top executives quit amid possible ad revenue misreporting and buy-out talks with i-Cable Communications and others were reported.

In 2008, the 163.com domain attracted at least 1.8 million visitors annually by 2008 according to a Compete.com survey. In 2010 the site was the 28th most visited site in the world according to Alexa's internet rankings. NetEase's official website address is 163.com. This was attributed to the past when Chinese internet users had to dial "163" to connect to the internet, before the availability of broadband internet. NetEase is the largest provider of free e-mail services in China with more than 940 million users as of 2017. In addition to 163.com, the company also runs 188.com, 126.com and more.

The company also operates a news website at news.163.com along with an associated app. In 2022, Riot Games sued NetEase over alleged copyright violation concerning Riot Game's Valorant.

Expansion and acquisitions
NetEase launched their first Western Headquarters in August 2014, bringing one of the largest tech companies in China to the US. In January 2020, NetEase  discussed secondary listings with the Hong Kong Exchanges and Clearing.

In 2018 NetEase invested US$100 million into Bungie for a minority stake in the company and a seat on its board of directors. In December of the same year NetEase invested in New Zealand developer A44 (Formally known as Aurora 44), and it sold its comics business to Bilibili. In 2019 NetEase obtained a minority stake in Quantic Dream for an undisclosed investment.

In June 2020 NetEase established a Japanese studio called "Sakura Studio" to develop next-generation console games.

NetEase acquired Grasshopper Manufacture from GungHo Online Entertainment in October 2021, incorporating the developer within their NetEase Games division.

In May 2022, NetEase opened its first US studio in Austin, Texas.  It is called Jackalope Games, and is led by Jack Emmert, a veteran of massively multiplayer online role-playing games who worked on titles including City of Heroes, Neverwinter, Star Trek Online, and DC Universe Online.  They will work on PC and console games and operate independently from NetEase.

Toshihiro Nagoshi, Daisuke Sato, along with their former Sega employees established a new studio called Nagoshi Studio, which will also be a part of their subsidiary.

In August 2022, NetEase announced the acquisition of Quantic Dream after the 2019 minority investment done in the company. After this, the studio will become a subsidiary part of its parent company and will help NetEase objective to have more console game releases.

In October 2022, NetEase announced the establishment of GPTRACK50 Studio, a development company focused on console releases and led by former Capcom producer Hiroyuki Kobayashi as the president. 

In January 2023, it was announced NetEase had acquired the Canadian studio, Skybox Labs. In February, NetEase announced the founding of a new studio, Spliced.

In February 2023, it was announced that NetEase Games fund video game division in Gotanda, Tokyo known as "Studio Flare", co-founded by former vice-president of Marvelous, Toshinori Aoki and former producer of  Arc System Works' BlazBlue series, Toshimichi Mori.

Partnerships

The company has a history of partnerships with other companies. In 2008, Blizzard Entertainment partnered with NetEase to bring some of their games to the Chinese market. Both NetEase and Blizzard announced the suspension of most game services within Mainland China by January 2023 due to the expiration of current licensing agreement.  According to NetEast's statement on November 17, 2022, Overwatch 2, Diablo III, World of Warcraft, StarCraft, Hearthstone, and Heroes of the Storm will no longer receive service in mainland China on January 23, 2023 and will not be renewed. 

In April 2012, NetEase began testing a restaurant recommendation mobile app called "Fan Fan". In 2017 NetEase made an agreement with the American company Marvel Comics to develop a comic based on a Chinese superhero. In addition 12 comic copies by Marvel would be released online, such as The Amazing Spider-Man, Captain America, and Guardians of the Galaxy.

The company collaborated with coursera.org to provide Massive Open Online Course (MOOC) in China. In 2014, NetEase launched an online course platform with educational content.

Chinese government regulation

In October 2020, the Cyberspace Administration of China ordered NetEase to undergo "rectification" and temporarily suspended certain comment functions after censors found "inappropriate" comments on its news app.

Games
NetEase publishes many games, including Fantasy Westward Journey, Cyber Hunter and Identity V.

Licensed online games
 Three-year agreement to license Blizzard's title Overwatch in PRC
 Agreement to license Mojang's Minecraft and Minecraft: Pocket Edition in China
 Operated the Chinese third-party Minecraft Hypixel server (which shut down)
 Will assume the publishing of EVE Online in the Chinese market starting in October 2018

References

External links
 

 
2000 initial public offerings
Chinese brands
Chinese companies established in 1997
Chinese news websites
Companies based in Beijing
Companies based in Guangzhou
Companies listed on the Nasdaq
Internet technology companies of China
Video game companies established in 1997
Video game companies of China
Video game development companies
Video game publishers